Briggsville is an unincorporated community in the southwest corner of Marquette County, Wisconsin. It is located on Wisconsin Highway 23 in the town of Douglas. It uses ZIP code 53920.

Geography
Briggsville is located on the eastern side of Mason Lake. The Bonnie Oaks Historic District is a little over a mile to the east. Briggsville is also the home of The National Shrine of Saint Philomena.

Notable people
Arthur S. Champeny, United States Army officer
Frank J. Kimball, legislator
Margery Latimer, writer
Willam Murphy, legislator

References

Unincorporated communities in Wisconsin
Unincorporated communities in Marquette County, Wisconsin